The Tulsa Grand Prix Tennis Tournament was a men's tennis tournament played in Tulsa, Oklahoma in the United States.  The event was played as part of the Grand Prix circuit from 1978 through 1980. The event was sponsored as Bank of Oklahoma Tennis Classic $50,000 and played at Shadow Mountain Racket Club on outdoor hard courts.

Finals

Singles

Doubles

References

External links
 ATP Tour archive

Tulsa
Defunct tennis tournaments in the United States
Grand Prix tennis circuit
Tulsa
Tulsa
Sports in Tulsa, Oklahoma